Bolma modesta, common name the modest bolma, is a species of sea snail, a marine gastropod mollusk in the family Turbinidae, the turban snails.

Description
The size of the shell varies between 33 mm and 55 mm. The imperforate, orange-rose shell is conically turbinated. The whorls are convexly sloping, then encircled with two rows of scales, papillary grained throughout. The base of the shell is rather flat, tinged with chrome orange.

Distribution
This marine species occurs off Japan, China and Taiwan

References

 Schepman 1908-1913, The Prosobranchia of the Siboga Expedition; Leyden,E. J. Brill,1908-13
 Williams, S.T. (2007). Origins and diversification of Indo-West Pacific marine fauna: evolutionary history and biogeography of turban shells (Gastropoda, Turbinidae). Biological Journal of the Linnean Society, 2007, 92, 573–592.
 Alf A. & Kreipl K. (2011) The family Turbinidae. Subfamilies Turbininae Rafinesque, 1815 and Prisogasterinae Hickman & McLean, 1990. In: G.T. Poppe & K. Groh (eds), A Conchological Iconography. Hackenheim: Conchbooks. pp. 1–82, pls 104-245

External links
 Beu A.G. & Ponder W.F. (1979) A revision of the species of Bolma Risso, 1826 (Gastropoda: Turbinidae). Records of the Australian Museum 32(1): 1–68. [31 May 1979]
 

modesta
Gastropods described in 1843